Boricua College is a private college in New York City designed to serve the educational needs of Puerto Ricans and other Hispanics in the United States. It was founded by Victor G. Alicea and several others.

Faculty
The school employs a largely bilingual faculty and staff of 130 full-time and 100 part-time members. According to its Self Study Report (2014) to the Middle States Association of Colleges and Schools, in fall 2012-13 it had 59.5 full-time faculty and 25 part-time adjunct faculty. Over 90% are Latinos. It serves a student population of 1,200.

Campuses

The college has four campuses:  in Audubon Terrace, Washington Heights, Manhattan; North Williamsburg, Brooklyn; East Williamsburg, Brooklyn; and the Bronx.

Accreditation
Boricua College is accredited by the Middle States Association of Colleges and Schools. In the spring of 2014 the Teacher Education Accreditation Council (TEAC/CAEP) evaluated Boricua College's Audit Brief and recommended it "above standard" for TEAC's three quality principles: Candidate Learning, Faculty Learning, and Capacity and Commitment of the institution. TEAC/CAEP met and accepted the recommendation and accredited, for the maximum allowable of seven years (spring 2014 to spring 2021), the college's Bachelor of Science degree program in Childhood Education that included the Generic Studies Liberal Arts and Sciences core curriculum program, and the Masters in Science degree program in Teaching English to Speakers of Other Languages (TESOL). This national achievement complements the authorization of these programs by the New York State Education Department and the State Certification of the graduates.

Student body and graduation
The college is regarded as "nontraditional" because of its competency-based model of education, emphasizing the importance of critical thinking skills and clarification of values and increasing students' capacity for self-reflection. Its student body is 79% adult (over 25 years old with family responsibilities) which puts it in the nontraditional category.

In his book Access to Freedom, James Hall considered Boricua College as a nontraditional college. Hall explains that these colleges cater to adult, working students who may take much longer than the six years taken by traditional students to graduate.

Boricua College's graduation rate is given by the National Center for Educational Statistics (a resource generally used by US Department of Education's office of statistics) to be 54% among first-time college students who entered in 2006 and graduated in 2012. When students who transfer out to other colleges are taken into account, that positive completion rate is given by the National Center as 69%. Further, during the last 10 years the college's education department has program completers who pass the New York State certification examinations at more than the required 80% rate.

Notable alumni

Félix Ortiz, former New York State Assemblyman and Assistant  Speaker of the New York State Assembly.
Robert Torres (stage name Sabor Latino), Hip Hop artist and author

Notable visitors
In January 2000 President Bill Clinton visited the Brooklyn campus at its Graham Avenue learning center to inaugurate a Small Business Association at the college. Boricua was one of the two colleges the president visited that were not for commencement purposes during his eight years at the White House.

References

External links
Boricua College

Universities and colleges in New York City
Educational institutions established in 1974
Universities and colleges in Brooklyn
Universities and colleges in Manhattan
Universities and colleges in the Bronx
Liberal arts colleges in New York City
1974 establishments in New York City